Iqaluit City Council is the governing body of the city of Iqaluit, Nunavut, Canada. As of November 2019, the council consists of mayor Kenny Bell and councillors Joanasie Akumalik, Simon Nattaq, Romeyn Stevenson, Janet Pitsiulaaq Brewster, Solomon Awa, Kyle Sheppard, Sheila Flaherty and Malaiya Lucassie.

From 1964 to 1979, Frobisher Bay was led by community council and chair. After 1979–1980, Frobisher Bay had a town council and mayor and since 2001 a city council and a mayor.

The council is elected fully at-large, with the mayor and all eight councillors elected citywide.

2006-2009

Mayor: Elisapee Sheutiapik (acclaimed)
Glenn Williams
Jimmy Kilabuk
Marc Boudreau
Jim Little
David Alexander
Simon Nattaq
Claude Martel
Al Hayward

On 10 September 2008, CBC North reported that Sheutiapik would be taking a leave of absence to run in the upcoming Nunavut election. She ran in Iqaluit West, which had the highest voter turnout at 90.2% but was defeated by incumbent MLA Paul Okalik by 44 votes. She subsequently returned to the mayor's chair.

2009-2012
The 2009 municipal election was held on 19 October. Elisapee Sheutiapik and former councillor, Jim Little, were both running for mayor. Sheutiapik won with 57.7% of the vote to Little's 42.3%.

For council, a total of 21 people ran for the eight seats. These included incumbents Glenn Williams, Jimmy Kilabuk, David Alexander, Simon Nattaq and Claude Martel. On the day of the election Alexander was shown with 597 votes, one more than Romeyn Stevenson. However a recount was held and Stevenson gained five more votes for a total of 601.

2010 by-elections
Incumbent mayor Elisapee Sheutiapik and councillor Natsiq Alainga-Kango both resigned in 2010, Sheutiapik for personal reasons and Alainga-Kango to run for the presidency of Nunavut Tunngavik. A by-election on December 13, 2010, chose Madeleine Redfern to succeed Sheutiapik as mayor and Joanasie Akumalik to succeed Alainga-Kango on council.

2012 election

2015 election

Elected to council 
Gideonie Joamie 
Joanasie Akumalik
Simon Nattaq
Megan Pizzo Lyall
Jason Rochon
Romeyn Stevenson
Kuthula Matshazi
Terry Dobbin

2019 election

Elected to council

Janet Pitsiulaaq Brewster
Joanasie Akumalik	
Solomon Awa	
Romeyn Stevenson	
Kyle Sheppard	
Sheila Flaherty	
Simon Nattaq	
Malaiya Lucassie

Mayors and Council Chairs

From 1964 to 1979 the settlement was headed by a chair.

Village of Frobisher Bay 1964-1980
 Gordon Rennie 1964-1969
 Bryan Pearson 1969-1979

The Chair was renamed as mayor in 1979 and Frobisher Bay became a town in 1980.

Town of Frobisher Bay 1980-1987
 Bryan Pearson 1979-1985

Town of Iqaluit 1987-2001
 Joe Kunuk 1994-1997
 Jimmy Kilabuk 1997-2000
 John Matthews 2000

City status was granted in 2001.

City of Iqaluit
 John Matthews 2001-2003
 Elisapee Sheutiapik 2003-2010
 Madeleine Redfern 2010–2012
 John Graham 2012–2014 (Stepped down in June 2014)
 Mary Wilman 2014-2015 (Interim mayor)
 Madeleine Redfern 2015–2019
 Kenny Bell (2019–present)

References

External links
City of Iqaluit

Politics of Nunavut
Municipal councils in Canada
Iqaluit
Government of Nunavut